Amphitorna confusata is a moth in the family Drepanidae. It was described by Warren in 1899. It is found in the Obi Islands of Indonesia.

The wingspan is about 39 mm. The forewings are greyish-liver colour, tinged with glossy lilac. The costal area is paler. The whole wing is crossed by numerous irregularly waved blackish lines, arranged in pairs and forming indistinct fasciae. There are tawny patches beyond and below the cell, and above the anal angle. The hindwings are similar, but the whole marginal area is tawny, with the black lines thickened.

References

Moths described in 1899
Drepaninae
Moths of Indonesia